Astrid Marie Nistad (born 9 December 1938 in Fjaler) is a Norwegian politician for the Labour Party.

When Gro Harlem Brundtland formed her second cabinet in 1986, Nistad was appointed State Secretary in the Ministry of Petroleum and Energy.

She was then elected to the Norwegian Parliament from Sogn og Fjordane in 1989, and was re-elected on two occasions.

References

1938 births
Living people
Labour Party (Norway) politicians
Members of the Storting
Women members of the Storting
21st-century Norwegian politicians
21st-century Norwegian women politicians
20th-century Norwegian politicians
20th-century Norwegian women politicians
People from Fjaler